Richardson Hall, also known as College Building and Main Hall, is a historic institutional building at St. Lawrence University, Canton, in St. Lawrence County, New York. It is a three-story rectangular brick structure built on a high sandstone foundation. When constructed in 1855–1856, it housed the dining room, chapel, classrooms, and dormitory space. It was renovated in 1906 and 1962. It is located within the St. Lawrence University-Old Campus Historic District.

It was listed on the National Register of Historic Places in 1974.

References

University and college buildings on the National Register of Historic Places in New York (state)
Residential buildings completed in 1856
Buildings and structures in St. Lawrence County, New York
National Register of Historic Places in St. Lawrence County, New York
1855 establishments in New York (state)